Dmitry Maksimov (born 6 May 1977) is a Russian long-distance runner.

He finished sixth in the 10,000m final at the 2006 European Athletics Championships in Gothenburg.

He also competed in the same event at the 2000 Olympics, but did not qualify from his heat.

References

 Profile at Russian athletics

1977 births
Living people
Russian male cross country runners
Russian male long-distance runners
Olympic male long-distance runners
Olympic athletes of Russia
Athletes (track and field) at the 2000 Summer Olympics
Russian Athletics Championships winners